Kaldereta or caldereta is a goat meat stew from the Philippines. Variations of the dish use beef, chicken, or pork.

Commonly, the goat meat is stewed with vegetables and liver paste. Vegetables may include tomatoes, potatoes, olives, bell peppers, and hot peppers. Kaldereta sometimes includes tomato sauce.

Caldereta's name is derived from the Spanish word caldera meaning cauldron. The dish is similar to meat stews from the Iberian Peninsula and was brought to the Philippines by the Spaniards during their 300-year occupation of the Philippines.

It also has its similarities with afritada and mechado that it uses tomatoes, potatoes, carrots and bell peppers as its ingredients.

Kaldereta is served during special occasions, parties, and festivities.

See also
 Scouse (food)
 List of goat dishes
 List of stews

References

External links
 

Philippine stews
Goat dishes